Jeriel Nicolás De Santis Córdova (born 18 June 2002) is a Venezuelan footballer who plays as a forward for Spanish club Cartagena B on loan from the Portuguese club Boavista.

Career statistics

Club

Notes

References

2002 births
Living people
Venezuelan footballers
Venezuela youth international footballers
Association football forwards
Caracas FC players
Boavista F.C. players
FC Cartagena B players
Venezuelan Primera División players
Primeira Liga players
Segunda Federación players
Venezuelan expatriate footballers
Expatriate footballers in Portugal
Venezuelan expatriate sportspeople in Portugal
Expatriate footballers in Spain
Venezuelan expatriate sportspeople in Spain